Roger Vrigny (19 May 1920, Paris – 16 August 1997, Lille) was a 20th-century French writer.

Biography 
A professor, Roger Vrigny turned to the theater in 1950 by founding a small company ("La Compagnie du Miroir"), before devoting himself to literature with his first novel, Arban, in 1954. He entered literature under the aegis of the writer and poet Robert Mallet. Also a radio personality, Roger Vrigny hosted the program Belles Lettres on the ORTF in 1955, then the Matinée littéraire on France Culture from 1966. For thirty years, he animated various literary programs, the most recent being "Lettres Ouvertes", aired every Wednesday on France Culture. He was a member of the jury of the Prix Renaudot. Roger Vrigny never stopped working as a novelist, essayist and publisher, all activities also marked by discretion and demand.

In 1963, he received the Prix Femina for his book La Nuit de Mougins, and in 1989 the Grand prix de littérature de l'Académie française for all of his work.

His last published work, Instants dérobés (Éditions Gallimard, 1996), was composed of extracts from his diary held from 1972 to 1991.

He died at the age of 77. He is buried in Picardy, in his village of adoption Wiry-au-Mont.

Works 
1954: Arban, Gallimard
1956: Lauréna, Gallimard
1958: Barbégal, Gallimard
1963: La Nuit de Mougins, Prix Femina
1968: Fin de journée, Gallimard
1972: La vie brève, Gallimard
1974: Pourquoi cette joie ?, Gallimard
1979: Un ange passe, Gallimard
1983: Sentiments distingués, Éditions Grasset, Prix Dumas-Millier of the Académie française
1985: Accident de parcours, followed by Amour and Une tache sur la vitre, Gallimard
1988: Le bonhomme d'Ampère, Gallimard
1989: Sang Indien et autres nouvelles (Roger Vrigny wrote the preface of this collection) (La Découverte / Le Monde) Prix du jeune écrivain 1989.
1990: Les Cœurs sensibles, Gallimard
1990: Le besoin d'écrire, Grasset
1990: La Confession de Rousseau (theatre), Editions Actes Sud-Papiers
1994: Le Garçon d’orage, Gallimard
1996: Instants dérobés, Gallimard
1998: Ciel de lit et autres nouvelles, Mercure de France, collective work including texts by Roger Vrigny, Olivier Balazuc, François-Xavier Molia, Rodolfo Pinto...

Adaptations 
1983:  by  after Franz Kafka
1989: 
1996: Roger Vrigny's novel Le Garçon d’orage was adapted for television by Jérôme Foulon with
 Daniel Russo as Marcellin
 Vincent Lecœur as Willie
 Véronique Silver as Germaine
 François Berléand as Le Boîteux

Script 
 1999:  by

External links 
 Roger Vrigny on Babelio
 Roger Vrigny, la mort d'un humaniste au regard perçant on L'Humanité (18 August 1997)
 Roger Vrigny La Vie brève on INA.fr (29 September 1972)
 Roger Vrigny on the site of the Académie française

20th-century French non-fiction writers
French radio presenters
Prix Femina winners
Writers from Paris
1920 births
1997 deaths